Vialikaja Bierastavica is a town in Belarus, Grodno Region, Bierastavica District. It is the capital city of Bierastavica District. It is located near the city of Grodno.

Urban-type settlements in Belarus
Populated places in Grodno Region
Byerastavitsa District
Trakai Voivodeship
Grodnensky Uyezd
Białystok Voivodeship (1919–1939)
Belastok Region